Twins of Evil: Hell Never Dies Tour was the third double bill concert tour co-headlined by American rock bands Rob Zombie and Marilyn Manson. The tour was staged by concert promoter LiveNation, following the critical and commercial success of the Twins of Evil franchise, from July 9, 2019, until August 18, 2019, and included stops at the Rock USA and Rock Fest concert festivals in mid-July. It covered 24 dates throughout North America, including 6 shows in Canada, and lasted for 6 weeks.

The tour was a sequel to the "Twins of Evil Tour" (2012) and the "Twins of Evil: The Second Coming Tour" with special guest Deadly Apples (2018) and similarly visited arena-sized venues. It was also staged to generate anticipation for the follow-up LPs to Manson's tenth studio album Heaven Upside Down (2017) and Zombie's sixth solo album The Electric Warlock Acid Witch Satanic Orgy Celebration Dispenser (2016). Both bands were in varying stages of writing and recording their respective follow-up LPs during this tour. Zombie was also in post-production for his 2019 film 3 from Hell.

Background

Following the critical and box office success of 2012's "Twins of Evil Tour" and 2018's "Twins of Evil: The Second Coming Tour", as well as the positive reception to both group's joint cover of The Beatles song "Helter Skelter", concert producer LiveNation conceived of a third joint outing for both bands. Despite coinciding with the writing and recording sessions for the follow up LPs to The Electric Warlock Acid Witch Satanic Orgy Celebration Dispenser and Heaven Upside Down by Rob Zombie and Marilyn Manson, respectively, both bands announced the tour on their social media feeds on February 18, 2019. Zombie was also working on post-production for his 2019 film 3 from Hell during this time.

The tour ran for six weeks, starting on July 9, 2019, at the Royal Farms Arena in Baltimore, Maryland until its conclusion on August 18, 2019, at the Bank of New Hampshire Pavilion in Gilford, New Hampshire. The tour joined the Rock USA and Rock Fest concert festivals in mid-July. Artist presales started on February 20, 2019. Blabbermouth.net held their own presales the following day. General sales commenced on February 22, 2019. VIP attendees were offered five premium packages which included perks such as an autographed Epiphone guitar and a meet and greet with both artists.

Line-up

Marilyn Manson
 Marilyn Manson – vocals
 Paul Wiley – rhythm guitar
 Juan Alderete – bass
 Brandon Pertzborn – drums

Rob Zombie
Rob Zombie – vocals
Piggy D. – bass, backing vocals
John 5 – guitar, bass, backing vocals
Ginger Fish – drums

Tour dates

References
Notes

References

External links
Twins Of Evil: Rob Zombie & Marilyn Manson - Hell Never Dies Tour 2019 (archived)
Twins of Evil: Hell Never Dies Tour packages

Marilyn Manson (band) concert tours
2019 concert tours
Co-headlining concert tours
Rob Zombie concert tours